The Chilean school uniform has since the early-1930s been used by the majority of students in Chilean schools.

Until 1930, mandatory schools uniforms were not common. However, Carlos Ibáñez del Campo's administration determined that all students in educational institutions had to wear some sort of uniform.

During the administration of Eduardo Frei Montalva, a unified school uniform (navy blue jumpers and white blouses for girls, grey slacks, white dress shirts and navy blue blazers for boys) was made mandatory for all educational institutions, public or private.

Nowadays, the traditional uniform has been fading progressively from schools. Most private and public institutions have preferred using customized uniforms showing school colors and emblems. Also, some private schools have forgone the use of uniforms entirely, though not using one is still considered uncommon.

References 

Education in Chile
Chilean culture
School uniform